Demiro Pozzebon (born 31 August 1988) is an Italian football player. He plays for Modica Calcio.

Club career
He made his Serie B debut for Avellino on 23 September 2014 in a game against Frosinone.

On 16 July 2019, he joined Gozzano. On 31 January 2020, he returned to Avellino on loan.

References

External links
 

1988 births
Footballers from Rome
Living people
Italian footballers
Association football forwards
Montevarchi Calcio Aquila 1902 players
S.S. Arezzo players
A.C. Sansovino players
Olbia Calcio 1905 players
U.S. Avellino 1912 players
L'Aquila Calcio 1927 players
S.S.D. Lucchese 1905 players
A.C.R. Messina players
Catania S.S.D. players
U.S. Triestina Calcio 1918 players
S.S.C. Bari players
A.C. Gozzano players
U.S. Bitonto players
Serie B players
Serie C players
Serie D players